18 Aurigae is a star located 233 light years away from the Sun in the northern constellation of Auriga. The brightness of this object is near the limit of visibility to the naked eye under good viewing conditions, appearing as a dim, white-hued star with an apparent visual magnitude of 6.49. The star is moving away from the Sun with a heliocentric radial velocity of 7 km/s.

This is an ordinary A-type main-sequence star with a stellar classification of A7 V, which indicates it is generating energy by hydrogen fusion at its core. The object is 950 million years old with a high rate of spin, showing a projected rotational velocity of 124 km/s. It has 1.7 times the mass of the Sun and 1.9 times the Sun's radius. The star is radiating 10 times the luminosity of the Sun from its photosphere at an effective temperature of 7,432 K.

18 Aurigae has a magnitude 12.50 companion star at an angular separation of  along a position angle of 167°, as of 2006.

References

External links
 CCDM JJ05194+3359
 HR 1734
 Image 18 Aurigae

A-type main-sequence stars
Binary stars
Auriga (constellation)
Durchmusterung objects
Aurigae, 18
034499
024832
1734